Cell growth-regulating nucleolar protein is a protein that in humans is encoded by the LYAR gene (Ly-1 antibody reactive clone).

LYAR contains a zinc finger motif and three copies of nuclear localization signals. LYAR is mainly localized to the nucleoli. LYAR is present at high levels in early embryos and preferentially in the liver fetal thymus.

References

Further reading